HMS Dryad is a former stone frigate (shore establishment). It was the home of the Royal Navy's Maritime Warfare School from the Second World War until it moved to HMS Collingwood at Fareham in 2004. The site was handed over to the Ministry of Defence in 2005 and is now occupied by the Defence School of Policing and Guarding.

See also
 Southwick House

References

Education in Portsmouth
Royal Navy bases in Hampshire
Buildings and structures in Portsmouth
Royal Navy shore establishments